The Tayma stones, also Teima stones, were a number of Aramaic inscriptions found in Tayma, now northern Saudi Arabia. The first four inscriptions were found in 1878 and published in 1884, and subsequently included in the Corpus Inscriptionum Semiticarum II as numbers 113-116. In 1972, ten further inscriptions were published, and in 1987 seven further inscriptions were published. Many of the inscriptions date to approximately the 5th and 6th centuries BCE.

The inscriptions were first discovered in modern times by Charles Montagu Doughty in 1876; he copied two of the texts, and his notes were later published in his 1888 Travels in Arabia Deserta. A handwritten note below the copies stated that: "Another stone with a like inscription is said to be among the fallen down in the ruin of the Hadaj". French explorer Charles Huber saw the steles in situ in 1878, and took copies of them which he published in the Bulletin de la Société de Géographie de Paris. Huber subsequently made a second trip to retrieve the steles, but he died before he could publish them. The first publication was made by Theodor Nöldeke on July 10, 1884, with information provided by Julius Euting. German traveler  Julius Euting mentioned that he had found seen the stone on Sunday February 17, 1884 AD during his visit to Tayma, accompanied by Charles Huber.

The largest of the inscriptions is known as the "Tayma stone". The second largest is known as the Salm stele. The steles are known as KAI 228-230	and CIS II 113-115.

The Tayma Stone

Description 
Carved of limestone weighing 150 kg, length 110 cm, width 43 cm, and thickness 12 cm, and it has an inscription in the Aramaic language of twenty-three lines.

It was originally to be sent to Germany, but ultimately was sent to France, where it is now displayed in the Louvre Museum.

The head of the person standing in the upper part of the obelisk resembles the helmets that used to appear on the heads of the warriors of Assyrians and Babylonians.

Text 
The inscription states that the Akkadian king invaded the city of Tayma and killed its people, its king, and the inhabitants of the surrounding areas, confiscated and slaughtered their livestock, and enslaved the remaining survivors of the people of Tayma and the Arabs and made them work in construction for him as slaves before they were killed

<blockquote>He (the Akkadian king) made a far way, and the state of the arrival, killed the amputation of the king of the city of Tayma and the (blood) of the people of the city (Tayma) and the people of the city (Tayma) and the people of the surrounding areas, but he himself resided in Taima and with him the Akkadian forces and the camels of the city (Tayma He built a palace similar to the palace of Babylon and built .... and deposited the wealth of the city (Taima) and the wealth of the surrounding area in .... and the guards surrounded him ..... and regretted in a loud voice (the captives) ....... made them (the captives) (They carry bricks and baskets from the reward of work ...)
 (`` Two months ... killing people ... men and ... women, young and old ... they lost their kingdom ... the barley in it (Taima))  '
</blockquote>
 Historical significance 
The steles have historical significance, as they represent an important part of the history of Tayma and of the history of the Arabian Peninsula. The Saudi Antiquities Authority have stated their desire to repatriate the stones, as they is at the forefront of the national archaeological treasures found abroad.

Gallery

 See also 
 Tayma

Bibliography
 Nöldeke, Theodor, "Altaramäische Inschriften aus Teimâ (Arabien)." SPAW Jun-Dec (1884): 813–20.
 Charles Montagu Doughty, 1884, Documents épigraphiques recueillis dans le Nord de l'Arabie
 Renan, E., "Les inscriptions araméennes de Teimâ." RA 1 (1884-85): 41–45
 Euting, J., Nabatäische Inschriften aus Arabien, Berlin: G. Reimer, 1885
 Neubauer, A., "On Some Newly-Discovered Temanite and Nabataean Inscriptions." Studia biblica 1 (1885): 209–32.
 Neubauer, A., "The God ṣlm ." The Athenaeum 2992 (28 Feb.) (1885a): 280.
 Halévy, J., "Encore un mot sur l'inscription de Teima." REJ 12 (1886): 111–13.
 Charles Montagu Doughty, Travels in Arabia Deserta''. Cambridge. Cambridge: Cambridge Univ. Press, 1888.
 Duval, R., "La Dîme à  Teima." RA 2 (1888): 1–3.
 Winckler, H., "Zur Inschrift von Teima." Pp. 76–77 In Altorientalische Forschungen. , Leipzig: E. Pfeiffer, 1898.
 Littman, E. (1904), "The stele of Teima in Arabia: a welcome of the gods", The Monist,. XIV, 510-515
 Dougherty, Raymond P. “A Babylonian City in Arabia.” American Journal of Archaeology, vol. 34, no. 3, 1930, pp. 296–312
 Degen, Rainer, "Die aramäischen Inschriften aus Ṭaimāˀ und Umgebung." NESE 2 (1974a): 79–98.
 Livingstone, A. et al. , "Taimā:Recent Soundings and New Inscribed Material (1402/1982)." Atlal 7 (1983): 102–16, pls. 87-97.
 Cross, F.M., "A New Aramaic Stele from Taymā." CBQ 48 (1986): 387–94
 Beyer, K. and Livingstone, A., "Die neuesten aramäischen Inschriften aus Taima." ZDMG 137 (1987): 285–96.
 Beyer, K. and Livingstone, A., "Eine neue reichsaramäische Inschrift aus Taima." ZDMG 140 (1990): 1–2.
 al-Theeb, S.A. R., Aramaic and Nabatean Inscriptions from North-West Saudi Arabia. . King Fahd National Library: Riyadh, 1993.
 McCarter, P.K., Jr., "What Are Two Aramaic Stelae Doing in Saudi Arabia?." BAR 21/2 (1995): 72–73.

External links 
 Tayme Stone at the Louvre
 Obelisk of Tayma ... Saudi antiquity in the French Louvre Museum.

References 

Aramaic inscriptions
Archaeological discoveries in Saudi Arabia
1884 archaeological discoveries